Hunga guillauminii is a species of plant in the family Chrysobalanaceae. It is endemic to New Caledonia.

References

guillauminii
Endemic flora of New Caledonia
Vulnerable plants
Taxonomy articles created by Polbot